Thornton railway station is located on the Main Northern line in New South Wales, Australia. It serves Thornton in the eastern suburbs of Maitland opening in 1913.

The original station opened on 1 August 1871 as Woodford and was renamed in 1887 to avoid confusion with Woodford station in the Blue Mountains. The line from Tarro was duplicated in 1880 and quadrupled in February 1913 when the current station opened.

To the south-west of the station, the Bloomfield Colliery branches off.

Platforms & services
Thornton has two side platforms. It is serviced by NSW TrainLink Hunter Line services travelling from Newcastle to Maitland, Muswellbrook, Scone, Telarah and Dungog.

Transport links
Hunter Valley Buses operate two routes to and from Thornton station:
182: to Rutherford
189: to Stockland Green Hills

References

External links

Thornton station details Transport for New South Wales

Easy Access railway stations in New South Wales
Maitland, New South Wales
Railway stations in the Hunter Region
Railway stations in Australia opened in 1913
Regional railway stations in New South Wales
Main North railway line, New South Wales